A window screen (also known as insect screen, bug screen, fly screen, flywire, wire mesh, or window net) is designed to cover the opening of a window. It is usually a mesh made of metal, fibreglass, plastic wire, or other pieces of plastic and stretched in a frame of wood or metal. It serves to keep leaves, debris, bugs, birds, and other animals from entering a building or a screened structure such as a porch, without blocking fresh air-flow.

Most houses in Australia, the United States and Canada and other parts of the world have screens on windows to prevent entry of flying insects such as mosquitoes, flies and wasps. In some regions such as the northern United States and Canada, screens were required to be replaced by glass storm windows in the winter, but now combination storm and screen windows are available, which allow glass and screen panels to slide up and down.

For screens installed on aluminium frames, the material is cut slightly larger than the frame, then laid over it, and a flexible vinyl cord, called a spline, is pressed over the screen into a groove (spline channel) in the frame. The excess screen is then trimmed close to the spline with a sharp utility knife.

The spline is often manufactured with parallel ridges running along the length of the spline to provide a better grip and compression when it is pressed into the spline channel. A spline roller — a special tool that consists of a metal (or plastic) wheel on a handle — is used to press the spline into the frame. The wheel edge is concave, to help it hold the spline and not slip off to the side.  Some spline rollers are double-ended and have both convex and concave rollers; the convex roller can be used to seat the spline deeper into the channel without risk of cutting the screen. Driving the spline into the channel tends to tension the screen on the frame, so the installer must avoid pre-tensioning the screen excessively to prevent the frame from becoming warped.

History
"Wove wire for window screens" are referenced in the American Farmer in 1823. Advertisement for wire window screens also appeared in Boyd's Blue Book in 1836. Two wire window screens were exhibited at Quincy Hall in Boston in 1839.

In 1861 Gilbert, Bennett and Company was manufacturing wire mesh sieves for food processing. An employee realized that the wire cloth could be painted gray and sold as window screens and the product became an immediate success. On July 7, 1868, Bayley and McCluskey filed a U.S. Patent, number 79541 for screened roof-top rail-car windows, allowing ventilation, while preventing "sparks, cinders, dust, etc." from entering the passenger compartment. By 1874, E.T. Barnum Company of Detroit, Michigan advertised screens that were sold by the square foot.

Window screens designed specifically to prevent insect entry were not patented in the United States, although by 1900 several patents were awarded for particular innovations related to window screen design.  By the 1950s, parasitic diseases were largely eradicated in the United States in part due to the widespread use of window screens. Today many houses in Australia, the United States and Canada have screens on operable windows.

Uses
A window screen prevents insects flying or crawling into a house without obstructing the view or airflow through the window. It is not generally intended to prevent young children from falling out of the window, stop home intruders, or defend against larger animals.

Collecting water
Screen mesh may collect condensation. This effect has been used to collect water from fog.

Decoration

Screen painting is a folk art consisting of paintings on window screens. It is also possible to print images directly onto fiberglass screen cloth using specially designed inkjet printers.

Fabric types

The most common materials used for the mesh of window screens are aluminum and fiberglass. Aluminum is generally available in natural aluminum or in an applied black or charcoal color, which make the screening less visible. Fiberglass is available in light gray as well as charcoal colors, the charcoal again offering better viewing and appearance. Fiberglass is less expensive, and has the advantage of not "denting" when hit or pushed, but it is somewhat more opaque than aluminum. For this reason, dark aluminum allows a better view of windows from the exterior, detracting less than fiberglass from the architectural effect of traditional divided-light window styles.

For applications requiring greater strength, such as screened doors (which have a larger area than windows), nylon and polyester screening is often used. However, these materials are not generally used for smaller applications such as window screens.

Bronze insect screening is much more expensive, but gives much longer service than either aluminum or fiberglass. When first installed, it has a bright gold color; this weathers to an unobtrusive dark charcoal within a year or less. Weathered bronze darkens the external appearance of windows to approximately the same degree as charcoal or black aluminum. Bronze is somewhat more resistant to denting than aluminum. Less common screen fabrics include copper, brass, stainless steel, and galvanized steel. For coastal locations, corrosion resistance usually requires the use of bronze or synthetic screening fabric.

Some manufacturers offer screening that promise to substantially reduce the visibility of the screening. Several manufacturers offer screens that roll into a pocket when not in use. These are available for casement windows as well as other types of window and door openings. 

Do-it-yourself screen and frame replacement kits are widely available at hardware and home improvement stores. One kind is composed of straight aluminum sides (which can be cut to size) and plastic corner inserts. Screen replacement kits usually consist of a roll of nylon screening fabric and a generous supply of rubber spline. 

In addition to insect screening, denser screen types that also reduce sunlight and heat gain are available. These offer significant potential energy savings in hot climates. Other manufacturers offer screens designed to filter for pollen and dust.

Temporary, removable screens that fit within window tracks of double-hung windows are a common expedient widely available in hardware and home improvement stores. A sliding mechanism allows the screen to be adjusted laterally to fit the width of most windows, which also allows the screen to fit securely within the tracks below the open sash.

Screen sizes
The  and  sizes are generally used for single hung windows, while the two larger sizes are used for double hung windows. As  is not a common size, the  thickness may be used instead and shimmed as needed. They come in a variety of colors including unpainted, white, bronze, tan, black, desert sand, etc. The screen may also include a crossbar for added strength.

Aluminum screen material is available in  rolls except the range of available widths is less than for the more commonly used fiberglass. The fineness of a screen mesh is measured in wires per inch on the warp (length) and the weft or filler (width). An 18×14 mesh has become standard; 16×16 was formerly common and other common sizes are 18×18 and 20×20. For comparison, a typical screen in a clothes dryer has a nylon 23x23 mesh screen.

Fiberglass solar screens provide over 75% of UV protection, by using thicker strands and a closer mesh than regular 18x14 fiberglass window screening. There is some reduction in visibility, but this can be advantageous, since solar screens are difficult to see through from the outside, while easier to see through from the inside.

Finer meshes have been developed to prevent very small insects, often called "noseeums" from flying through. The finer mesh screens are also used to prevent pollens and allergens from entering homes in order to control allergic reactions.

Gallery

See also

 Mosquito net

 Screen door

Notes

 

Screen
Insect repellents